San Carlos Airport  is an airport serving San Carlos, the capital of Cojedes state in Venezuela. It is also known  as Aeropuerto Ezquiel Zamora. Runway length does not include a  displaced threshold on Runway 15.

See also
Transport in Venezuela
List of airports in Venezuela

References

External links
OurAirports - San Carlos
OpenStreetMap - San Carlos
SkyVector - San Carlos

Airports in Venezuela
Airport
Buildings and structures in Cojedes (state)